Sweden competed at the 2012 Summer Olympics in London, from 25 July to 12 August 2012. Swedish athletes have competed at every edition of the Summer Olympic Games in the modern era, except for the 1904 Summer Olympics in St. Louis. The Swedish Olympic Committee (SOK) sent a total of 134 athletes to the Games, 55 men and 79 women, to compete in 20 sports. For the second consecutive time in its Olympic history, Sweden was represented by more female than male athletes.

Sweden left London with a total of 8 Olympic medals (1 gold, 4 silver, and 3 bronze), tying with Tokyo and Atlanta for the overall highest medal count. Two medals each were awarded to athletes in sailing and wrestling, and one each in equestrian, handball, and triathlon. For the first time since 1992, Sweden won more than a single Olympic medal in Greco-Roman wrestling.

Among the nation's medalists were Star sailors Fredrik Lööf and Max Salminen, who together won Sweden's only gold medal in London, the nation's first in eight years. Lisa Nordén, who finished eighteenth in Beijing, became the first Swedish athlete to win an Olympic medal in women's triathlon. Meanwhile, equestrian eventing rider Sara Algotsson Ostholt managed to win the nation's only silver medal in her sport. Sweden's team-based athletes also equalled their previous best Olympic results after 12 years, as they achieved a silver medal in men's handball. Several Swedish athletes narrowly missed out on the medal places in their events, including long jumper Michel Tornéus, singles sculls rower Lassi Karonen, swimmers Sarah Sjöström and Therese Alshammar, and sprint kayakers Sofia Paldanius and Anders Gustafsson.

Medalists

Delegation

Sveriges Olympiska Kommitté (SOK) selected a team of 134 athletes, 55 men and 79 women, to compete in 20 sports; it was the nation's fourteenth largest team sent to the Olympics outside the host nation. Handball and women's football were the only team-based sports in which Sweden had its representation in these Olympic games. There was only a single competitor in archery, badminton, mountain biking, judo, and triathlon. Sailing was the largest team by individual-based sport, with a total of 14 competitors. Sweden also marked its Olympic return in men's handball after a twelve-year absence.

The Swedish team featured past Olympic medalists, four of them from Beijing (road cyclists Gustav Larsson and Emma Johansson, sailor Fredrik Lööf in the Star class, and equestrian show jumper Rolf-Göran Bengtsson, who competed at his fifth Olympics). For being the oldest and most experienced athlete, Bengtsson, at age 50, was Sweden's flag bearer at the opening ceremony. Table tennis player Jörgen Persson became the second Swedish athlete to compete in seven Olympic games, tying the record set by pistol shooter and former Olympic record holder Ragnar Skanåker. Dressage rider Tinne Vilhelmsson-Silfvén, and butterfly swimmer Lars Frölander, along with Lööf, competed at their sixth Olympics. Meanwhile, four other Swedish athletes made their fifth Olympic appearance, along with Bengtsson: equestrian eventing rider Linda Algotsson, freestyle swimmer Therese Alshammar, and sprint kayak pair and double Olympic medalists Henrik Nilsson and Markus Oscarsson. Gymnast Jonna Adlerteg, at age 17, was the youngest athlete of the team.

Other notable Swedish athletes featured sprint kayaker and world champion Anders Gustafsson, butterfly swimmer and triple European champion Sarah Sjöström, tennis doubles specialist Robert Lindstedt, triathlete and former World Series champion Lisa Nordén, and equestrian eventing rider Sara Algotsson Ostholt, who made her Olympic comeback in London after a twelve-year absence.

| width=78% align=left valign=top |
The following is the list of number of competitors participating in the Games. Note that reserves in football and handball are not counted as athletes:

Archery

Athletics

Swedish athletes have so far achieved qualifying standards in the following athletics events (up to a maximum of 3 athletes in each event at the 'A' Standard, and 1 at the 'B' Standard):

Key
 Note – Ranks given for track events are within the athlete's heat only
 Q = Qualified for the next round
 q = Qualified for the next round as a fastest loser or, in field events, by position without achieving the qualifying target
 NR = National record
 N/A = Round not applicable for the event
 Bye = Athlete not required to compete in round

Men
Field events

Women
Track & road events

Field events

Combined events – Heptathlon

Badminton

Boxing

After the 2012 European Boxing Olympic Qualification Tournament, Sweden has qualified two boxers. Anna Laurell received a wild card.

Men

Women

Canoeing

Sprint

Qualification Legend: FA = Qualify to final (medal); FB = Qualify to final B (non-medal)

Cycling

Road

Mountain biking

Diving

Men

Women

Equestrian

Dressage
Sweden has qualified one team and three individual quota places after finishing in fourth place at the 2011 European Dressage Championship. Rose Mathisen is a reserve in the team dressage event.

Eventing
Sweden has qualified one team and five quota places in the individual event after finishing in fourth place at the 2011 European Eventing Championships.

Jumping
After the 2011 European Championships, Sweden has qualified four quota places in the individual event and one place in the team event.

Football

Summary

Women's tournament

Sweden women's football team qualified for the event by finishing as the best of the European teams in the 2011 FIFA Women's World Cup.

Team roster

Preliminary round

Quarterfinal

Gymnastics

Jonna Adlerteg ensured a quota place at the 2012 Olympic Test Event.

Artistic
Women

Adlerteg was ranked 31st in the uneven bars event, 63rd in the balance beam event, and 70th in the floor event.

Handball

Summary

Sweden women's handball team qualified to the Olympic Games as runners-up from the European Championships, and the men's team qualified through the IHF Qualification Tournament.

Men's tournament

Team roster

Group play

Quarter-final

Semi-final

Gold medal match

Women's tournament

Team roster

Group play

Judo

Rowing

Sweden qualified two boats at the 2011 World Championships.

Men

Women

Qualification Legend: FA=Final A (medal); FB=Final B (non-medal); FC=Final C (non-medal); FD=Final D (non-medal); FE=Final E (non-medal); FF=Final F (non-medal); SA/B=Semifinals A/B; SC/D=Semifinals C/D; SE/F=Semifinals E/F; Q=Quarterfinals; R=Repechage

Sailing

At the 2011 World Championships in Perth, Sweden qualified boats in all classes with Swedish participation.

Men

Women
Fleet racing

Match racing

Open

M = Medal race; EL = Eliminated – did not advance into the medal race;

Shooting

Sweden has qualified four quota places in the shooting events.

Men

Women

Swimming

Men

Women

Table tennis

Sweden has qualified two men in the men's singles event, and one woman. Kristian Karlsson is selected as reserve in the men's team event.

Taekwondo 

Elin Johansson has ensured a quota place for Sweden in the women's 67 kg by reaching the top 3 of the 2011 WTF World Qualification Tournament.

Tennis

Triathlon

Wrestling

Sweden has qualified three quota places in the men's Greco-Roman wrestling, and three other quota places in the women's freestyle wrestling.

Key
  - Victory by Fall.
  - Decision by Points - the loser with technical points.
  - Decision by Points - the loser without technical points.

Men's Greco-Roman

Women's freestyle

See also
Sweden at the 2012 Winter Youth Olympics
Sweden at the 2012 Summer Paralympics

References

External links
Swedish Olympic Committee
List of Sweden's participants

Nations at the 2012 Summer Olympics
2012
Summer Olympics